Roy Oliver Disney (June 24, 1893 – December 20, 1971) was an American businessman who co-founded The Walt Disney Company with Walt Disney. He was the older brother of Walt Disney and the father of Roy E. Disney.

Biography

Early life
Disney was born to Irish-Canadian Elias Charles Disney and English-German-American Flora Call Disney in Chicago, Illinois. The family moved to Marceline, Missouri and to Kansas City in 1911. On July 1, 1911, Elias purchased a newspaper delivery route for The Kansas City Star. It extended from 27th Street to the 31st Street, and from Prospect Avenue to Indiana Avenue. Roy and his brother, Walt worked as newspaper delivery-boys.  The family delivered the morning newspaper, The Kansas City Times, to approximately 700 customers, and The Kansas City Star to more than 600. The number of customers served increased with time.

Disney graduated from the Manual Training High School of Kansas City in 1912. He left the paper delivery route and worked on a farm in the summer. He was then employed as a bank clerk along with brother Raymond Arnold Disney at the First National Bank of Kansas City.  

Disney served in the United States Navy from 1917 to 1919. Roy contracted tuberculosis and was therefore discharged from military duty. He forsook his banking career and hospital bed and in 1923, brother Walt joined Roy in Hollywood and the two planned the start of Disney Brothers Studio. The brothers ordered kit houses from Los Angeles-based Pacific Ready Cut Homes and, in 1928, built their homes adjacently on Lyric Avenue in the Los Feliz neighborhood.

Walt Disney Productions
While Walt led the creative side, Roy guided the business side and finances. Together Roy and Walt founded Disney Studios as brothers, but Walt later bought out most of Roy's share in 1929 so, unlike Max and Dave Fleischer of rival Fleischer Studios, Roy was not a co-producer. However, Roy was an equal partner in all facets of the production company.

Disney became the company's first CEO in 1929, although the official title was not given to him until 1966. He also shared the role of chairman of the board with Walt from 1945 and succeeded Walt in the position of President around this time as well. He held the position until 1968 when he handed it to Donn Tatum. In 1960, Walt dropped the chairman title so he could focus more on the creative aspects of the company. Following Walt's death on December 15th, 1966 from lung cancer, Roy postponed his retirement to oversee the construction of what was then known as Disney World. For five years after Walt's death, Roy was able to open the resort with a cost of $400 million without having additional debt.  He later renamed it Walt Disney World as a tribute to his brother.

Personal life
Roy was married to Edna Francis from April 1925 until his death. Roy met Edna Francis in Kansas City, Missouri when she worked at The Kansas City Times along with close friend Meredith A. Boyington and she introduced Meredith to Raymond Arnold Disney, who was an older brother to Roy O. Disney. Raymond and Meredith were married, and were lifetime close friends to Edna and Roy and they had two sons: Charles Elias Disney and Daniel H. Disney. Roy and Edna's son Roy Edward Disney, was born on January 10, 1930. Roy Edward Disney later was vice chairman of The Walt Disney Company. Throughout his life, Roy Oliver Disney rejected the publicity and fame that came with being Walt's brother. Roy's nephew Charles Elias Disney chose to name his son Charles Roy Disney in Roy's honor. Roy remained a member of the Freemasons for decades before he resigned his membership.

Death

After the opening of Walt Disney World on October 1, 1971, Roy finally retired and died on December 20, 1971, five days after his younger brother's fifth death anniversary, from a stroke, at the age of 78. He is interred in Forest Lawn Memorial Park (Hollywood Hills) next to his wife Edna Francis in Los Angeles.

Legacy

One of the Walt Disney World Railroad locomotives was named after Roy. On June 6, 2002, his son Roy E. Disney rededicated this locomotive in his father's honor. In 2016, the locomotive took part in its centennial celebration hosted by the Carolwood Pacific Historical Society. One of the Hong Kong Disneyland Railroad locomotives is also named after Roy.

The Roy O. Disney Concert Hall, the primary performance space for the Herb Alpert School of Music at the California Institute of the Arts (of which Disney was a benefactor), is named after him.

A statue of Roy seated on a park bench beside Minnie Mouse is located in the Town Square section of Main Street, U.S.A., at the Magic Kingdom theme park in Florida. A duplicate is located outside the Team Disney building at Disney's corporate headquarters in Burbank, California. There is a third statue at the Tokyo Disneyland theme park. The Roy O. Disney Suite is located on the top floor of the Hong Kong Disneyland Hotel.

In 2014, Roy O. Disney was portrayed in the feature film Walt Before Mickey by Jon Heder.

See also
 Walt Disney (2015 PBS film)

References

Further reading
Bob Thomas Building a Company: Roy O. Disney and the Creation of an Entertainment Empire. Disney Editions, 1998.

External links

 
  

1893 births
1971 deaths
20th-century American businesspeople
American bankers
American company founders
American film studio executives
American film production company founders
American Freemasons
American people of Canadian descent
American people of English descent
American people of German descent
American people of Irish descent
Amusement park developers
Businesspeople from Chicago
Military personnel from Illinois
Military personnel from Missouri
Burials at Forest Lawn Memorial Park (Hollywood Hills)
Roy O.
Disney executives
California Republicans
Illinois Republicans
Missouri Republicans
United States Navy sailors
United States Navy personnel of World War I
Chairmen of The Walt Disney Company
People from Los Feliz, Los Angeles